Krifate is a small Arab hilali  town and rural commune in Fquih Ben Salah Province, Béni Mellal-Khénifra, Morocco. At the time of the 2004 census, the commune had a total population of 34,103 people living in 5932 households.

References

Populated places in Fquih Ben Salah Province
Rural communes of Béni Mellal-Khénifra